Linda Marion Dessau  (born 8 May 1953) is an Australian jurist, barrister, and the 29th and current Governor of Victoria since 1 July 2015. She is the first female and the first Jewish holder of the office. She was a judge of the Family Court of Australia from 1995 to 2013.

Early life
Dessau was born in Melbourne, Victoria, on 8 May 1953, the youngest of four children. Her father, John Dessau, arrived in Melbourne from Poland in 1929. At first he took on factory work, but later he became a businessman. He married Sybil, who was born in Melbourne.

Education and career
Dessau was educated at St Catherine's School, Toorak, matriculating at the age of sixteen. She graduated with a Bachelor of Laws with Honours from the University of Melbourne in 1973 as its youngest law graduate. She worked as a solicitor from 1974 to 1978, and as a barrister from 1979 to 1995, specialising in family law and commercial litigation.

Dessau was appointed to the AFL Commission in November 2007. She is a supporter of the Essendon Football Club, and in 1997 she started, and was the inaugural chair of, the Essendon Women's Network, which for more than a decade has maintained a strong presence in the grand final week calendar. She was appointed to the board of the Melbourne Festival, of which she became president in 2014.

Governor
Dessau is one of five Jews to have served in a viceregal capacity in Australia, after governors-general Sir Isaac Isaacs and Sir Zelman Cowen, and governors Sir Matthew Nathan (Queensland) and Gordon Samuels (New South Wales). In August 2016, Dessau was embroiled in an expenses scandal, which saw her personally repay the expenses of lunches at a Gordon Ramsay restaurant (Pétrus) and Harrods, which had originally been paid by the Victorian taxpayer. In 2016, the level of expenses for capital works and ongoing maintenance requested by Dessau were alleged to be excessive, and a former Government House employee told the Herald Sun that the working environment there was "toxic".

On 1 November 2021, Dessau succeeded Queensland governor Paul de Jersey as the longest-serving incumbent state governor. She thus received a dormant commission to act as Administrator of the Commonwealth in the absence of the governor-general of Australia.

Personal life

Dessau is married to Anthony Howard AM KC, a former judge of the County Court of Victoria. They were married in 1982 and have two sons. In 2021 their son Ollie became engaged to Lauren Thurin, the granddaughter of billionaire property developer John Gandel.

Honours

Orders
  14 June 2010: Member of the Order of Australia (AM) "For service to the judiciary, particularly through contributions in the area of family law policy and practice, and to the community."
  26 January 2017: Companion of the Order of Australia (AC) "For eminent service to the people of Victoria through leadership roles in the judiciary, to the advancement of economic ties and business relationships, and as a supporter of charitable, sporting and arts organisations."
  11 February 2016: Dame of the Order of St John.
  1 January 2023: Commander of the Royal Victorian Order (CVO)

Organisations
  1994: Churchill Fellowship. She travelled to the United States, Canada and the United Kingdom to study strategies employed to reduce delay within the court system.
  2018: Victorian Honour Roll of Women by the Victorian State government.

Appointments
  2015: Colonel of the Royal Victoria Regiment.
  2015: Deputy Prior of the Order of St John.

References

External links
 Her Excellency the Honourable Linda Dessau AM
 Linda Dessau

1953 births
Living people
Australian Jews
Judges of the Family Court of Australia
Australian women judges
Australian magistrates
Australian barristers
Companions of the Order of Australia
Australian Commanders of the Royal Victorian Order
Governors of Victoria (Australia)
Melbourne Law School alumni
Australian people of Polish-Jewish descent
20th-century Australian judges
21st-century Australian judges
20th-century women judges
21st-century women judges
20th-century Australian women
Judges from Melbourne
People from East Melbourne
People educated at St Catherine's School, Melbourne